The 2014–15 Stony Brook Seawolves women's basketball team represented Stony Brook University in the America East Conference.  The Seawolves were led by first-year head coach Caroline McCombs and will play their home games at the Island Federal Credit Union Arena. They finished the season 17-13, 10-6 in America East play for a third-place finish. They lost in the quarterfinals of the 2015 America East women's basketball tournament to UMBC. They were invited to the 2015 Women's Basketball Invitational where they lost to Siena in the first round.

Media
All non-televised home games and conference road games will stream on either ESPN3 or AmericaEast.tv. Most road games will stream on the opponents website. All games will have an audio broadcast streamed online through the Pack Network.

Roster

Schedule

|-
!colspan=12 style="background:#FF0101; color:#646464;"| Regular season

|-
!colspan=12 style="background:#646464; color:#FF0101;"| 2015 America East tournament

|-
!colspan=12 style="background:#646464; color:#FF0101;"|WBI

See also
2014–15 Stony Brook Seawolves men's basketball team
Stony Brook Seawolves women's basketball

References

Stony Brook Seawolves women's basketball seasons
Stony Brook Seawolves women's basketball team
Stony Brook Seawolves women's basketball team
Stony Brook Seawolves women's basketball team